Solarium is a 2021 French short film directed by Jonathan Koulavsky. The thirty minute story follows a young driver of trot racing as he experiences self-doubt, frustration and isolation. The short has been presented in a number of festivals, including the 2022 Rhode Island International Film Festival. The film is part of the 2023 César Narrative Short Films Selection.

Plot 
Johnny, a 16 year-old rider who dreams of one day becoming a trot champion, is faced with self-doubt when he realises that his horse, Coquelicot, is at risk for not being good enough.

Reception 
Since its release, the film has been selected in various festivals and academies around the world

References

External links 
 Solarium on IMDb.
 Solarium at Unifrance.

2021 films
2021 short films
French short films
Films about horses
French sports films